Armen Gyulbudaghyants, is an Armenian association football manager and former footballer. He is the former manager of the Armenia national football team.

Career
During his career, Gyulbudaghyants managed the Armenian Premier League clubs of FC Banants, FC Pyunik, Impulse FC and Alashkert FC.

In 2002, he managed the Armenia U19 and Armenia U21 national teams.

Managerial statistics

References

Armenian footballers
Soviet footballers
Armenian football managers
People from Vanadzor
FC Pyunik managers
FC Alashkert managers
FC Urartu managers
Armenia national football team managers
1966 births
Living people
Association football midfielders
FC Armavir (Armenia) players
FC Lori players
FC Urartu players
Armenia international footballers
Soviet Armenians